Ice is a 2003 Indian Tamil-language romance film directed by R. Raghuraj. The film stars Ashok and Priyanka Trivedi, while Vivek and Mouli appeared in other pivotal role. The film produced by, had music scored by Devi Sri Prasad. This film is the Tamil remake of the 2002 Telugu film Kalusukovalani. The film released in 2003 to below average collections and reviews.

Cast

Ashok as Ashok
Priyanka Trivedi as Anjali
Haripriya as Madhavi
Vivek
Mouli as Vishwanathan
Devan
Anu Mohan
Madhan Bob
Manobala
Yuvarani
R. Sundarrajan
Anandaraj

Production
Ice is a remake of the director's 2002 Telugu film Kalusukovalani which featured Uday Kiran and Gajala. The film became the maiden production venture of Sherif Ahmed for his Joy Entertainment. Gayathri Raguram was first chosen to play the heroine, but was subsequently replaced by Priyanka Trivedi. Devi Sri Prasad's tunes from the original version were retained, while cranking the camera was Shri, who had apprenticed with P. C. Sriram. The sets are designed by M. Prabhakar, the stunt and dance choreography are by Shiva and Cool Jayant respectively. At the YMCA grounds, Chennai, a song was picturised on the hero. After a schedule in Chennai, the unit shifts to locations abroad to the Alps.

Soundtrack 
Devi Sri Prasad reused many songs from the original Telugu film.

Release
The Hindu commended the film's technical aspects but stated "as the game goes on without respite, the viewer feels restless and exasperated." 

Soon after the release of the films, Ashok signed on to appear in Varma opposite Chaya Singh. However the project was later cancelled.

References

2003 films
Indian romantic comedy films
Tamil remakes of Telugu films
2000s Tamil-language films
Films scored by Devi Sri Prasad
2003 romantic comedy films